Ken Hailey (born July 12, 1961 in Oceanside, California) is a former defensive back who played eleven seasons in the Canadian Football League for three teams.

References

1961 births
Canadian football defensive backs
American players of Canadian football
Winnipeg Blue Bombers players
Ottawa Rough Riders players
BC Lions players
Living people
San Francisco State University alumni
San Francisco State Gators football players
Sportspeople from Oceanside, California